The 1992–93 UEFA Cup was won by Juventus, who beat Borussia Dortmund 6–1 on aggregate in the final, a record score for a UEFA Cup final. It was the third victory in the competition for the Italian team (first club to reach this record).

Three seasons had now passed since the ban on English clubs in European competitions as a result of the Heysel disaster (1985) had been lifted, and for this campaign the number of English clubs in the competition was increased from one to two. English league runners-up Manchester United were joined by third placed Sheffield Wednesday, though both teams ultimately had a short-lived run in the competition. Even Poland earned one more seat, while Finland and Hungary lost one.

Ajax were the defending champions, but were eliminated in the quarter-finals by Auxerre.

First round
Former Soviet Union now Community of Independent States had three places, and clubs qualified according to 1991 Soviet Top League, but after that UEFA recognized to Ukraine its own spot in the Cup Winners Cup, Chornomorets ceded their place in UEFA Cup to Dynamo Moscow.Yugoslavia was disqualified after UN ban: UEFA awarded one of its two places to Scotland, while the other one was given to Romania.Albanian clubs were excluded from all competitions in the 1992-93 season which allowed Austria to have three entries.East Germany ceased to participate as an independent association (having merged with the West German association due to the German reunification). This left UEFA one country short for the UEFA Cup, and therefore a new country (Slovenia) were given one spot. East Germany were no longer counted for the 1991 UEFA Country Ranking (decisive for the number of spots in the 1992-93 UEFA Cup). Turkey moved up to 21st place in that ranking and therefore were entitled to enter two clubs.

|}

1: The match was stopped in the 51st minute, while Paris Saint-Germain were leading by 2–0, due to incidents in the stands. Paris Saint-Germain were later awarded a 0–3 walkover win by UEFA.

First leg

Second leg

Galatasaray won 2–1 on aggregate.

0–0 on aggregate. Torpedo Moscow won 4–3 on penalties.

Borussia Dortmund won 8–2 on aggregate.

Juventus won 10–1 on aggregate.

BK Frem won 6–3 on aggregate.

3–3 on aggregate. Anderlecht won on away goals.

Kaiserslautern won 7–0 on aggregate.

Vitesse won 5–1 on aggregate.

Auxerre won 9–3 on aggregate.

Real Madrid won 5–1 on aggregate.

Standard Liège won 5–0 on aggregate.

Fenerbahçe won 5–3 on aggregate.

Ajax won 6–1 on aggregate.

Sigma Olomouc won 3–1 on aggregate.

Benfica won 9–0 on aggregate.

Copenhagen won 10–1 on aggregate.

Eintracht Frankfurt won 11–2 on aggregate.

Dynamo Moscow won 5–3 on aggregate.

Panathinaikos won 10–0 on aggregate.

Roma won 5–1 on aggregate.

Mechelen won 2–1 on aggregate.

Vác won 2–1 on aggregate.

Vitória de Guimarães won 3–2 on aggregate.

3–3 on aggregate. Dynamo Kyiv won on away goals.

Celtic won 3–2 on aggregate.

Hearts won 4–3 on aggregate.

Napoli won 6–1 on aggregate.

Grasshopper won 4–3 on aggregate.

Sheffield Wednesday won 10–2 on aggregate.

Torino won 3–1 on aggregate.

Match abandoned after 51 minutes due to fan trouble with Paris Saint-Germain leading 2–0 (Weah 15', Sassus 32'), game awarded 3–0 to Paris Saint-Germain. Paris Saint-Germain won 5–0 on aggregate.

Real Zaragoza won 4–3 on aggregate.

Second round

}}

|}

First leg

Second leg

Kaiserslautern won 5–3 on aggregate.

Roma won 6–4 on aggregate.

Auxerre won 7–0 on aggregate.

Zaragoza won 6–1 on aggregate.

Borussia Dortmund won 3–1 on aggregate.

Galatasaray won 1–0 on aggregate.

Sigma Olomouc won 7–2 on aggregate.

Standard Liège won 2–0 on aggregate.

Juventus won 1–0 on aggregate.

Paris Saint-Germain won 2–0 on aggregate.

Anderlecht won 7–2 on aggregate.

Real Madrid won 7–5 on aggregate.

Benfica won 6–1 on aggregate.

Dynamo Moscow won 2–1 on aggregate.

Vitesse won 2–0 on aggregate.

Ajax won 5–1 on aggregate.

Third round

|}

First leg

Second leg

Roma won 5–4 on aggregate.

Ajax won 3–0 on aggregate.

Borussia Dortmund won 4–3 on aggregate.

Benfica won 4–2 on aggregate.

1–1 on aggregate; Paris Saint-Germain won on away goals.

Juventus won 7–1 on aggregate.

Auxerre won 4–3 on aggregate.

Real Madrid won 2–0 on aggregate.

Quarter-finals

|}

First leg

Second leg

Borussia Dortmund won 2–1 on aggregate.

Auxerre won 4–3 on aggregate.

Paris Saint-Germain won 5–4 on aggregate.

Juventus won 4–2 on aggregate.

Semi-finals

|}

First leg

Second leg

2–2 on aggregate; Borussia Dortmund won 6–5 on penalties.

Juventus won 3–1 on aggregate.

Final

First leg

Second leg

Juventus won 6–1 on aggregate.

Top scorers
The top scorers from the 1992–93 UEFA Cup are as follows:

See also
1992–93 UEFA Champions League
1992-93 UEFA Cup Winners' Cup

External links

1992–93 All matches UEFA Cup – season at UEFA website
Official Site
Results at RSSSF.com
 All scorers 1992–93 UEFA Cup according to protocols UEFA
1992/93 UEFA Cup - results and line-ups (archive)

 
UEFA Cup seasons
2